George Gershwin (1898–1937), American composer, author of famous works such as Rhapsody in Blue and An American in Paris

Gershwin may also refer to:

People
 Ira Gershwin (1896–1983), brother of George Gershwin, American lyricist, author of famous works such as I Got Rhythm and They Can't Take That Away from Me
 Frances Gershwin (1906–1999), sister of George Gershwin, American violinist, singer, performer, and painter, after marriage known as Frances Godowsky
 Arthur Gershwin (1900–1981), brother of George Gershwin, American composer
 Gershwin A. Drain (born 1949), an American federal judge
 Lisa-ann Gershwin biologist and author

Other
 8249 Gershwin, an asteroid
 Gershwin operating system, a planned follow-on to the Copland operating system for Apple Computer
 Gershwin Prize, an award given by the US Library of Congress to a composer or performer for their lifetime contributions to popular music
 Gershwin Theatre, a Broadway theatre in the United States

Jewish surnames
Yiddish-language surnames